Roger Federer was the two-time defending champion and successfully defended his title, defeating Alex de Minaur in the final, 6–2, 6–2. He did not lose a single set in the entire tournament. The victory made Federer the first player in ATP history to win 10 same tournament titles on two different surfaces. It was his 103rd and final ATP title before announcing his retirement in 2022.

Seeds

Draw

Finals

Top half

Bottom half

Qualifying

Seeds

Qualifiers

Qualifying draw

First qualifier

Second qualifier

Third qualifier

Fourth qualifier

References

 Main draw
 Qualifying draw

Swiss Indoors - Singles